{{DISPLAYTITLE:Sorbose 5-dehydrogenase (NADP+)}}

In enzymology, a sorbose 5-dehydrogenase (NADP+) is an enzyme that catalyzes the chemical reaction

L-sorbose + NADP+  5-dehydro-D-fructose + NADPH + H+

Thus, the two substrates of this enzyme are L-sorbose and NADP+, whereas its 3 products are 5-dehydro-D-fructose, NADPH, and H+.

This enzyme belongs to the family of oxidoreductases, specifically those acting on the CH-OH group of donor with NAD+ or NADP+ as acceptor. The systematic name of this enzyme class is L-sorbose:NADP+ 5-oxidoreductase. Other names in common use include 5-ketofructose reductase, 5-keto-D-fructose reductase, sorbose (nicotinamide adenine dinucleotide phosphate) dehydrogenase, reduced nicotinamide adenine dinucleotide phosphate-linked, reductase, and sorbose 5-dehydrogenase (NADP+).

References 

 

EC 1.1.1
NADPH-dependent enzymes
Enzymes of unknown structure